The 1969 New York Yankees season was the 67th season for the team. The team finished in fifth-place in the newly established American League East with a record of 80–81, 28½ games behind the Baltimore Orioles. New York was managed by Ralph Houk. The Yankees played at Yankee Stadium.

Offseason 
 October 15, 1968: Steve Barber was drafted from the Yankees by the Seattle Pilots as the 37th pick in the 1968 MLB expansion draft.
 October 21, 1968: Jim Bouton was purchased from the Yankees by the Seattle Pilots.
 December 2, 1968: Billy Cowan was drafted by the Yankees from the Philadelphia Phillies in the 1968 rule 5 draft.
 December 4, 1968: Andy Kosco was traded by the Yankees to the Los Angeles Dodgers for Mike Kekich.
 December 6, 1968: Charley Smith was traded by the Yankees to the San Francisco Giants for Nate Oliver.
 January 8, 1969: John Orsino was purchased by the Yankees from the Washington Senators.
 Prior to 1969 season: Merritt Ranew was acquired from the Yankees by the Seattle Pilots.

Regular season 
 August 8, 1969: Thurman Munson made his major league debut for the Yankees.

Season standings

Record vs. opponents

Opening Day lineup 
 Horace Clarke 2B 
 Jerry Kenney CF 
 Bobby Murcer 3B 
 Roy White LF 
 Joe Pepitone 1B 
 Tom Tresh SS 
 Bill Robinson RF 
 Jake Gibbs C 
 Mel Stottlemyre P

Notable transactions 
 June 5, 1969: 1969 Major League Baseball Draft
Ken Crosby was drafted by the Yankees in the 10th round. Player signed June 17, 1969.
John Tamargo was drafted by the Yankees in the 15th round, but did not sign.
 June 12, 1969: John Orsino was traded by the Yankees to the Cleveland Indians for Rob Gardner.
 June 14, 1969: Tom Tresh was traded by the Yankees to the Detroit Tigers for Ron Woods.
 July 26, 1969: Billy Cowan was purchased by the California Angels from the New York Yankees.

Mickey Mantle's retired number 

On Mickey Mantle Day, June 8, 1969, in addition to the retirement of his uniform number 7, Mantle was given a plaque that would hang on the center field wall at Yankee Stadium, near the monuments to Babe Ruth, Lou Gehrig and Miller Huggins. The plaque was given to him by Joe DiMaggio, and Mantle then gave DiMaggio a similar plaque, telling the crowd, "His should be just a little bit higher than mine." The televised ceremony, aired on WPIX, was hosted by the team's television analyst Frank Messer and long time radio broadcaster Mel Allen.

Roster

Player stats

Batting

Starters by position 
Note: Pos = Position; G = Games played; AB = At bats; R = Runs scored; H = Hits; Avg. = Batting average; HR = Home runs; RBI = Runs batted in; SB = Stolen bases

Other batters 
Note: G = Games played; AB = At bats; R = Runs scored; H = Hits; Avg. = Batting average; HR = Home runs; RBI = Runs batted in; SB = Stolen bases

Pitching

Starting pitchers 
Note: G = Games pitched; IP = Innings pitched; W = Wins; L = Losses; ERA = Earned run average; BB = Walks allowed; SO = Strikeouts

Other pitchers 
Note: G = Games pitched; IP = Innings pitched; W = Wins; L = Losses; ERA = Earned run average; SO = Strikeouts

Relief pitchers 
Note: G = Games pitched; W = Wins; L = Losses; SV = Saves; ERA = Earned run average; SO = Strikeouts

Awards and honors 
 Mel Stottlemyre, All-Star Game
 Roy White, All-Star Game

Farm system 

LEAGUE CHAMPIONS: Syracuse, Oneonta

Notes

References 
1969 New York Yankees at Baseball Reference
1969 New York Yankees team page at www.baseball-almanac.com

New York Yankees seasons
New York Yankees
New York Yankees
1960s in the Bronx